Ionization (or ionisation) is the process by which an atom or a molecule acquires a negative or positive charge by gaining or losing electrons, often in conjunction with other chemical changes. The resulting electrically charged atom or molecule is called an ion. Ionization can result from the loss of an electron after collisions with subatomic particles, collisions with other atoms, molecules and ions, or through the interaction with electromagnetic radiation. Heterolytic bond cleavage and heterolytic substitution reactions can result in the formation of ion pairs. Ionization can occur through radioactive decay by the internal conversion process, in which an excited nucleus transfers its energy to one of the inner-shell electrons causing it to be ejected.

Uses
Everyday examples of gas ionization are such as within a fluorescent lamp or other electrical discharge lamps. It is also used in radiation detectors such as the Geiger-Müller counter or the ionization chamber. The ionization process is widely used in a variety of equipment in fundamental science (e.g., mass spectrometry) and in industry (e.g., radiation therapy).

Production of ions

Negatively charged ions are produced when a free electron collides with an atom and is subsequently trapped inside the electric potential barrier, releasing any excess energy. The process is known as electron capture ionization.

Positively charged ions are produced by transferring an amount of energy to a bound electron in a collision with charged particles (e.g. ions, electrons or positrons) or with photons. The threshold amount of the required energy is known as ionization potential. The study of such collisions is of fundamental importance with regard to the few-body problem, which is one of the major unsolved problems in physics. Kinematically complete experiments, i.e. experiments in which the complete momentum vector of all collision fragments (the scattered projectile, the recoiling target-ion, and the ejected electron) are determined, have contributed to major advances in the theoretical understanding of the few-body problem in recent years.

Adiabatic ionization 
Adiabatic ionization is a form of ionization in which an electron is removed from or added to an atom or molecule in its lowest energy state to form an ion in its lowest energy state.

The Townsend discharge is a good example of the creation of positive ions and free electrons due to ion impact. It is a cascade reaction involving electrons in a region with a sufficiently high electric field in a gaseous medium that can be ionized, such as air. Following an original ionization event, due to such as ionizing radiation, the positive ion drifts towards the cathode, while the free electron drifts towards the anode of the device. If the electric field is strong enough, the free electron gains sufficient energy to liberate a further electron when it next collides with another molecule. The two free electrons then travel towards the anode and gain sufficient energy from the electric field to cause impact ionization when the next collisions occur; and so on. This is effectively a chain reaction of electron generation, and is dependent on the free electrons gaining sufficient energy between collisions to sustain the avalanche.

Ionization efficiency is the ratio of the number of ions formed to the number of electrons or photons used.

Ionization energy of atoms

The trend in the ionization energy of atoms is often used to demonstrate the periodic behavior of atoms with respect to the atomic number, as summarized by ordering atoms in Mendeleev's table. This is a valuable tool for establishing and understanding the ordering of electrons in atomic orbitals without going into the details of wave functions or the ionization process. An example is presented in the figure at right. The periodic abrupt decrease in ionization potential after rare gas atoms, for instance, indicates the emergence of a new shell in alkali metals. In addition, the local maximums in the ionization energy plot, moving from left to right in a row, are indicative of s, p, d, and f sub-shells.

Semi-classical description of ionization
Classical physics and the Bohr model of the atom can qualitatively explain photoionization and collision-mediated ionization. In these cases, during the ionization process, the energy of the electron exceeds the energy difference of the potential barrier it is trying to pass. The semi-classical description, however, cannot describe tunnel ionization since the process involves the passage of electron through a classically forbidden potential barrier.

Quantum mechanical description of ionization
The interaction of atoms and molecules with sufficiently strong laser pulses leads to the ionization to singly or multiply charged ions. The ionization rate, i.e. the ionization probability in unit time, can only be calculated using quantum mechanics. In general, the analytic solutions are not available, and the approximations required for manageable numerical calculations do not provide accurate enough results. However, when the laser intensity is sufficiently high, the detailed structure of the atom or molecule can be ignored and analytic solution for the ionization rate is possible.

Tunnel ionization

Tunnel ionization is ionization due to quantum tunneling. In classical ionization, an electron must have enough energy to make it over the potential barrier, but quantum tunneling allows the electron simply to go through the potential barrier instead of going all the way over it because of the wave nature of the electron. The probability of an electron's tunneling through the barrier drops off exponentially with the width of the potential barrier. Therefore, an electron with a higher energy can make it further up the potential barrier, leaving a much thinner barrier to tunnel through and, thus, a greater chance to do so. In practice, tunnel ionization is observable when the atom or molecule is interacting with near-infrared strong laser pulses. This process can be understood as a process by which a bounded electron, through the absorption of more than one photon from the laser field, is ionized. This picture is generally known as multiphoton ionization (MPI).

Keldysh modeled the MPI process as a transition of the electron from the ground state of the atom to the Volkov states. In this model the perturbation of the ground state by the laser field is neglected and the details of atomic structure in determining the ionization probability are not taken into account. The major difficulty with Keldysh's model was its neglect of the effects of Coulomb interaction on the final state of the electron. As it is observed from figure, the Coulomb field is not very small in magnitude compared to the potential of the laser at larger distances from the nucleus. This is in contrast to the approximation made by neglecting the potential of the laser at regions near the nucleus. Perelomov et al. included the Coulomb interaction at larger internuclear distances. Their model (which we call PPT model) was derived for short range potential and includes the effect of the long range Coulomb interaction through the first order correction in the quasi-classical action. Larochelle et al. have compared the theoretically predicted ion versus intensity curves of rare gas atoms interacting with a Ti:Sapphire laser with experimental measurement. They have shown that the total ionization rate predicted by the PPT model fit very well the experimental ion yields for all rare gases in the intermediate regime of Keldysh parameter.

The rate of MPI on atom with an ionization potential  in a linearly polarized laser with frequency  is given by

where 
  is the Keldysh's adiabaticity parameter,
 ,
  is the peak electric field of laser and
 .

The coefficient  is given by

where

Quasi-static tunnel ionization
The quasi-static tunnelling (QST) is the ionization whose rate can be satisfactorily predicted by the ADK model, i.e. the limit of the PPT model when  approaches zero. The rate of QST is given by

As compared to  the absence of summation over n, which represent different above threshold ionization (ATI) peaks, is remarkable.

Strong field approximation for the ionization rate
The calculations of PPT are done in the E-gauge, meaning that the laser field is taken as electromagnetic waves. The ionization rate can also be calculated in A-gauge, which emphasizes the particle nature of light (absorbing multiple photons during ionization). This approach was adopted by Krainov model based on the earlier works of Faisal and Reiss. The resulting rate is given by

where:

 with  being the ponderomotive energy,
 is the minimum number of photons necessary to ionize the atom, 
 is the double Bessel function,
  
 with  the angle between the momentum of the electron, p, and the electric field of the laser, F, 
 FT is the three-dimensional Fourier transform, and 
  incorporates the Coulomb correction in the SFA model.

Atomic stabilization/population trapping
In calculating the rate of MPI of atoms only transitions to the continuum states are considered. Such an approximation is acceptable as long as there is no multiphoton resonance between the ground state and some excited states. However, in real situation of interaction with pulsed lasers, during the evolution of laser intensity, due to different Stark shift of the ground and excited states there is a possibility that some excited state go into multiphoton resonance with the ground state. Within the dressed atom picture, the ground state dressed by  photons and the resonant state undergo an avoided crossing at the resonance intensity . The minimum distance, at the avoided crossing is proportional to the generalized Rabi frequency,  coupling the two states. According to Story et al., the probability of remaining in the ground state, is given by

where  is the time-dependent energy difference between the two dressed states. In interaction with a short pulse, if the dynamic resonance is reached in the rising or the falling part of the pulse, the population practically remains in the ground state and the effect of multiphoton resonances may be neglected. However, if the states go onto resonance at the peak of the pulse, where , then the excited state is populated. After being populated, since the ionization potential of the excited state is small, it is expected that the electron will be instantly ionized.

In 1992, de Boer and Muller  showed that Xe atoms subjected to short laser pulses could survive in the highly excited states 4f, 5f, and 6f. These states were believed to have been excited by the dynamic Stark shift of the levels into multiphoton resonance with the field during the rising part of the laser pulse. Subsequent evolution of the laser pulse did not ionize completely these states leaving behind some highly excited atoms. We shall refer to this phenomenon as "population trapping".

We mention the theoretical calculation that incomplete ionization occurs whenever there is parallel resonant excitation into a common level with ionization loss. We consider a state such as 6f of Xe which consists of 7 quasi-degnerate levels in the range of the laser bandwidth. These levels along with the continuum constitute a lambda system. The mechanism of the lambda type trapping is schematically presented in figure. At the rising part of the pulse (a) the excited state (with two degenerate levels 1 and 2) are not in multiphoton resonance with the ground state. The electron is ionized through multiphoton coupling with the continuum. As the intensity of the pulse is increased the excited state and the continuum are shifted in energy due to the Stark shift. At the peak of the pulse (b) the excited states go into multiphoton resonance with the ground state. As the intensity starts to decrease (c), the two state are coupled through continuum and the population is trapped in a coherent superposition of the two states. Under subsequent action of the same pulse, due to interference in the transition amplitudes of the lambda system, the field cannot ionize the population completely and a fraction of the population will be trapped in a coherent superposition of the quasi degenerate levels. According to this explanation the states with higher angular momentum- with more sublevels- would have a higher probability of trapping the population. In general the strength of the trapping will be determined by the strength of the two photon coupling between the quasi-degenerate levels via the continuum. In 1996, using the very stable laser and by minimizing the masking effects of the focal region expansion with increasing intensity, Talebpour et al. observed structures on the curves of singly charged ions of Xe, Kr and Ar. These structures were attributed to electron trapping in the strong laser field. A more unambiguous demonstration of population trapping has been reported by T. Morishita and C. D. Lin.

Non-sequential multiple ionization
The phenomenon of non-sequential ionization (NSI) of atoms exposed to intense laser fields has been a subject of many theoretical and experimental studies since 1983. The pioneering work began with the observation of a "knee" structure on the Xe2+ ion signal versus intensity curve by L’Huillier et al. From the experimental point of view, the NS double ionization refers to processes which somehow enhance the rate of production of doubly charged ions by a huge factor at intensities below the saturation intensity of the singly charged ion. Many, on the other hand, prefer to define the NSI as a process by which two electrons are ionized nearly simultaneously. This definition implies that apart from the sequential channel  there is another channel  which is the main contribution to the production of doubly charged ions at lower intensities. The first observation of triple NSI in argon interacting with a 1 µm laser was reported by Augst et al. Later, systematically studying the NSI of all rare gas atoms, the quadruple NSI of Xe was observed. The most important conclusion of this study was the observation of the following relation between the rate of NSI to any charge state and the rate of tunnel ionization (predicted by the ADK formula) to the previous charge states; 

Two models have been proposed to explain the non-sequential ionization; the shake-off model and electron re-scattering model. The shake-off (SO) model, first proposed by Fittinghoff et al., is adopted from the field of ionization of atoms by X rays and electron projectiles where the SO process is one of the major mechanisms responsible for the multiple ionization of atoms. The SO model describes the NS process as a mechanism where one electron is ionized by the laser field and the departure of this electron is so rapid that the remaining electrons do not have enough time to adjust themselves to the new energy states. Therefore, there is a certain probability that, after the ionization of the first electron, a second electron is excited to states with higher energy (shake-up) or even ionized (shake-off). We should mention that, until now, there has been no quantitative calculation based on the SO model, and the model is still qualitative.

The electron rescattering model was independently developed by Kuchiev, Schafer et al, Corkum, Becker and Faisal and Faisal and Becker. The principal features of the model can be understood easily from Corkum's version. Corkum's model describes the NS ionization as a process whereby an electron is tunnel ionized. The electron then interacts with the laser field where it is accelerated away from the nuclear core. If the electron has been ionized at an appropriate phase of the field, it will pass by the position of the remaining ion half a cycle later, where it can free an additional electron by electron impact. Only half of the time the electron is released with the appropriate phase and the other half it never return to the nuclear core. The maximum kinetic energy that the returning electron can have is 3.17 times the ponderomotive potential of the laser. Corkum's model places a cut-off limit on the minimum intensity ( is proportional to intensity) where ionization due to re-scattering can occur.

The re-scattering model in Kuchiev's version (Kuchiev's model) is quantum mechanical. The basic idea of the model is illustrated by Feynman diagrams in figure a. First both electrons are in the ground state of an atom. The lines marked a and b describe the corresponding atomic states. Then the electron a is ionized. The beginning of the ionization process is shown by the intersection with a sloped dashed line. where the MPI occurs. The propagation of the ionized electron in the laser field, during which it absorbs other photons (ATI), is shown by the full thick line. The collision of this electron with the parent atomic ion is shown by a vertical dotted line representing the Coulomb interaction between the electrons. The state marked with c describes the ion excitation to a discrete or continuum state. Figure b describes the exchange process. Kuchiev's model, contrary to Corkum's model, does not predict any threshold intensity for the occurrence of NS ionization.

Kuciev did not include the Coulomb effects on the dynamics of the ionized electron. This resulted in the underestimation of the double ionization rate by a huge factor. Obviously, in the approach of Becker and Faisal (which is equivalent to Kuchiev's model in spirit), this drawback does not exist. In fact, their model is more exact and does not suffer from the large number of approximations made by Kuchiev. Their calculation results perfectly fit with the experimental results of Walker et al. Becker and Faisal have been able to fit the experimental results on the multiple NSI of rare gas atoms using their model. As a result, the electron re-scattering can be taken as the main mechanism for the occurrence of the NSI process.

Multiphoton ionization of inner-valence electrons and fragmentation of polyatomic molecules
The ionization of inner valence electrons are responsible for the fragmentation of polyatomic molecules in strong laser fields. According to a qualitative model the dissociation of the molecules occurs through a three-step mechanism:
MPI of electrons from the inner orbitals of the molecule which results in a molecular ion in ro-vibrational levels of an excited electronic state;
Rapid radiationless transition to the high-lying ro-vibrational levels of a lower electronic state; and
Subsequent dissociation of the ion to different fragments through various fragmentation channels.

The short pulse induced molecular fragmentation may be used as an ion source for high performance mass spectroscopy. The selectivity provided by a short pulse based source is superior to that expected when using the conventional electron ionization based sources, in particular when the identification of optical isomers is required.

Kramers-Henneberger frame and ionization phase effects
Studying the strong field ionization of the atom in so called Kramers-Henneberger (K-H) frame leads to the conclusion that the ionization efficiency strongly depends on the temporal details of the ionizing pulse but not necessarily on the field strength and the total energy of the ionizing pulse pumped into the atom. The Kramers-Henneberger frame is the non-intertial frame moving with the free electron under the influence of the harmonic laser pulse. The free electron solution of the Newton equations for the electron in one dimension in the harmonic laser field

will be also harmonic

The frame comoving with this electron will be obtained by the coordinate transformation

while the added Coulomb potential will be

The full cycle time-average of that potential which is 

The electron velocity on the other hand is phase shifted both to the field strength and to the electron position: 

Therefore, considering the wavelet pulses and defining the ionization as the full escape from the line segment of the length 2r (or from the spherical region in three dimensions) the full ionization happens in the classical model after the time  or no ionization at all depending if the harmonic field wavelet is cut at the zero minimum or the maximum velocity.

Dissociation – distinction
A substance may dissociate without necessarily producing ions. As an example, the molecules of table sugar dissociate in water (sugar is dissolved) but exist as intact neutral entities. Another subtle event is the dissociation of sodium chloride (table salt) into sodium and chlorine ions. Although it may seem as a case of ionization, in reality the ions already exist within the crystal lattice. When salt is dissociated, its constituent ions are simply surrounded by water molecules and their effects are visible (e.g. the solution becomes electrolytic). However, no transfer or displacement of electrons occurs.

See also
Above threshold ionization
Ionization chamber – Instrument for detecting gaseous ionization, used in ionizing radiation measurements
Ion source
Photoionization 
Thermal ionization
Electron ionization
Chemical ionization
Townsend avalanche – The chain reaction of ionization occurring in a gas with an applied electric field

Table

References

External links

 
Ions
Molecular physics
Atomic physics
Physical chemistry
Quantum chemistry
Mass spectrometry